The Charadros is a river in the northern part of Achaea, Greece. Its course lies entirely within the municipality of Patras.

Geography
The source of the river Charadros is in the Panachaiko mountains, northwest of its highest point. It flows in a northwestern direction through a narrow, forested valley. In its lower course, it passes the villages Skioessa and Kato Kastritsi. In the north bank is the University of Patras. The river is crossed by Greek National Road 8 and Motorway 5 as well as the Athens–Patras railway. It empties into the Gulf of Patras in the northern Patras neighbourhood Kastellokampos.

History

In Antiquity, the herdsmen believed that female animals that drank water from the river bore mostly male offspring; for this reason, they only watered their cows here. Alternative, historical names are Belbitsianiko and Bozaitiko.

References

Landforms of Achaea
Rivers of Greece
Rivers of Western Greece
Drainage basins of the Ionian Sea